Timothy Marx is an American television and film producer. His credits include productions with Arthur Penn, Sam Shepard, Neil Simon, Al Pacino, Penn & Teller, Garry Trudeau, Bill Moyers, among many others.

Early career
Early in his career Marx was a producer for the PBS series American Playhouse, where he produced 8 independent movies or miniseries, including the Sundance grand prize winner Smooth Talk (associate producer), Sam Shepard's True West with John Malkovich and Gary Sinise (line producer), Pete Gurney's The Dining Room, the mini-series Roanoak, Isaac Bashevis Singer's The Cafeteria, Carol Bly's Rachel River, and Richard Nelson's Sensibility and Sense.

Film and television productions
Currently Marx is producing the hit CBS series Young Sheldon for Chuck Lorre and Warner Bros television. In its first three seasons it has consistently been CBS' top rated comedy. In previous series television he produced the HBO series Entourage and executive produced and directed the comedy Arliss. He also produced Bady Daddy, The Nine Lives of Chloe King for ABC Family, Invasion for ABC, Justice and Likely Suspects for Fox and the pilot episodes of Enlightened (HBO), The Captain (CBS) and Related (ABC), among others. Marx also produced the HBO movie Citizen X which won the CableAce award for Best Picture and received PGA Best Picture, 7 Emmy, and 2 Golden Globe nominations. His comedy feature film credits include Passed Away, Penn & Teller Get Killed, Martin Lawrence: You So Crazy and the television comedy specials Garry Trudeau's Rap Master Ronnie and Penn & Teller's Invisible Thread. Other credits include Al Pacino's independent project The Local Stigmatic, Richard Benjamin's TNT version of Neil Simon's The Goodbye Girl and Deep Red, the premiere movie for the FX channel.

Non-fiction production
In non-fiction, Marx directed and produced Bluetopia: The LA Dodgers Movie'', which portrayed the unique bond the team has with the ethnically diverse population of Los Angeles.  Marx produced the IMAX movie for the US World's Fair Pavilion in Knoxville, Tennessee and numerous documentaries, including the American Masters portrait of Helen Hayes. He has worked on political campaign journals with Bill Moyers and numerous presidential and senatorial candidates.

Affiliations
Marx is a member of the DGA, PGA, and ATAS.  He is an adjunct professor at USC School of Cinematic Arts  and has been a lecturer, consultant and mentor in all aspects of production.

Personal life
Timothy Marx lives in Los Angeles with his wife Nan Simons Marx and their two children Sophie and Benjamin.

Filmography

Series and television movies
Baby Daddy - ABC Family
Bunheads – ABC Family
The Nine Lives of Chloe King – ABC Family
The Wedding Band – TBS
Enlightened – HBO
RPM – TNT
The Captain – CBS
Justice – Fox
Invasion – ABC
Related – WB
Expeditions to the Edge – NatGeo
Entourage – HBO
The Goodbye Girl –TNT
Better Days – ABC
Arli$$ – HBO	
Come on Get Happy – ABC
Likely Suspects – Fox
Radiant City – ABC
Two Mothers – ABC
Citizen X – HBO
Gemini Man – ABC
Haunting of Sea Cliff Inn – USA
Deep Red – USA
Precious Victims – CBS
Those Secrets – ABC
Helen Hayes – American Masters
Sensibility & Sense – American Playhouse
Deadline – Fox
Steel Magnolias – CBS
Rise & Rise of Daniel Rocket – American Playhouse
Roanoak – American Playhouse
True West – American Playhouse

Feature films
Bluetopia: The LA Dodgers Movie
Martin Lawrence: You So Crazy – Goldwyn
Passed Away – Hollywood Pictures
The Local Stigmatic – Independent Dir: Al Pacino
Penn & Teller Get Killed – Warner Bros. Dir: Arthur Penn
Rachel River – American Playhouse
Smooth Talk – American Playhouse
 Grand Prize, Sundance Film Festival

Comedy specials
Reno in Rage & Rehab – HBO
Garry Trudeau's Rap master Ronnie – HBO
Penn & Teller's Invisible Thread – Showtime

References

External links

Baseline.com

Year of birth missing (living people)
Living people
American television producers
American film producers